Charles Heron Mullan CBE DL (17 February 1912 – 26 October 1996), known as C. H. Mullan, was a judge and unionist politician in Northern Ireland.

Mullan studied at Rossall School, then read law at the University of Cambridge, graduating in 1934. He joined the Royal Naval Volunteer Reserve in 1937 and was called up on the outbreak of World War II, soon becoming a lieutenant.

At the 1945 Northern Ireland general election, Mullan unsuccessfully contested South Down for the Ulster Unionist Party.  However, he was elected to the Westminster Parliament at the 1946 Down by-election.  He then became a member of the Ulster Unionist Council.  In 1948, he qualified as a solicitor.  He was also promoted to Lieutenant Commander.

The Down constituency was abolished in 1950, and Mullan did not stand for an alternative seat.  In 1951, he left the Royal Navy.  He remained a member of the Ulster Unionist Council until 1960, when he became a magistrate. In 1974, he served as Deputy Lieutenant of County Down, and in 1979 he was appointed a CBE.

References

External links 
 

1912 births
1996 deaths
Commanders of the Order of the British Empire
Deputy Lieutenants of Down
Northern Ireland justices of the peace
Members of the Parliament of the United Kingdom for County Down constituencies (since 1922)
People educated at Rossall School
Royal Navy officers of World War II
UK MPs 1945–1950
Ulster Unionist Party members of the House of Commons of the United Kingdom
Alumni of Clare College, Cambridge